Vishen Lakhiani. (born 14 January 1976) is a Malaysian entrepreneur, author, and motivational speaker, of Indian descent. He is the founder and CEO of Mindvalley and the author of two books: The Code of the Extraordinary Mind and The Buddha and the Badass.

Career 
Born and raised in Kuala Lumpur, Lakhiani attended Malaysian government school. After graduating from high school, he moved to the United States and attended the University of Michigan where he received a bachelor's degree in Computer Engineering. After graduating from the University of Michigan in 2001, he moved to Silicon Valley.

Mindvalley 

Mindvalley is an educational technology company co-founded by Vishen Lakhiani and Michael Reining that publishes products focused on personal spiritual development and lifelong learning, such as the meditation app Omvana. Founded in New York City in December 2002, Reining and Lakhiani were forced to relocate Mindvalley to Kuala Lumpur, Malaysia in 2004 when the United States declined to renew Lakhiani's work visa. Mindvalley is an education company that offers teaching programs on mindfulness, meditation, personal growth, fitness, and health.

In late 2020, Mindvalley added a course on accessing altered states of mind and intuition called the Silva Method hosted by Lakhiani.

Dealmates 
Dealmates was a Malaysian-based e-commerce site that Lakhiani founded on 1 November 2010 with Patrick Grove as part of a joint-venture between Catcha Group and Mindvalley. Dealmates allegedly offered discounts from fashion, beauty, cosmetics, electronics and other vendors with allegedly over 30,000 visitors a day.
Their website does not exist anymore.

Blinklist and A-Fest 
Blinklist was a social bookmarking service, allowed users to organize their bookmarks based on keyword tags, see how others rated their bookmarks and view recently added, popular, or hot public bookmarks. The site has been turned into a tech-related blog featuring stories about startups and apps.

Lakhiani has also founded A-Fest, an invite-only conference offering training in entrepreneurship and mindfulness.

Book 
In May 2016, Vishen Lakhiani published the self-help book The Code of the Extraordinary Mind through Rodale, Inc. In the book, Lakhiani argues that a person's outlook on life is shaped by conditioning and habit, and offers 10 laws to help readers break free of this mindset. After its release, the book reached No. 10 on the New York Times Bestseller List for Advice, How-To & Miscellaneous.

In 2020 Vishen's second book "The Buddha & the Badass'' was published by Penguin-RandomHouse. The book peaked at number No. 1 on the Wall Street Journal Business Hardcover List and No. 9 on the New York Times How-To list.

Recognition 

Vishen Lakhiani made the Watkin's List of 100 Most Spiritually Influential Living People in 2021 and 2022. In 2022 he was #52 on the list.

At XPRIZE's Visioneering Event in 2015, Lakhiani was a member of the team that won the audience's vote for the best new XPRIZE Idea, involving housing for refugees.

Lakhiani was named "Most Strategic Entrepreneur" in the SME & Entrepreneurship Business Award, Malaysia, in 2017.  The Award is an annual recognition program organized by Yayasan Usahawan Malaysia.

Lakhiani is an AIESEC alumnus who speaks or advises in active support of both AIESEC and AIESEC Alumni International endeavors.

Vishen Lakhiani was a recipient of two awards at Estonian Startup Awards 2020 for his work on Mindvalley. Foreign Founder of the Year and Bootstrap Badger of the Year for scaling Mindvalley with minimal venture capital. The Foreign Founder of the Year award was presented to him by Estonian President Kersti Kaljulaid.

External links 

 Official web-site

References

Malaysian writers
Sayfol International School alumni
Malaysian chief executives
Panama Papers
Crown Publishing Group books
University of Michigan alumni
1976 births
Living people
Pseudoscience